Mike Gaskill is an American politician serving as a member of the Indiana Senate from the 25th district.

Education 
Gaskill graduated from Pendleton Heights High School and earned a Bachelor of Science degree in accounting and computer science from Anderson University.

Career 
Gaskill worked as a business systems manager for Praxair Surface Technologies before founding an insurance business. He was elected to the Indiana Senate in November 2018. He also serves as the ranking member of the Senate Insurance and Financial Institutions Committee.

References 

Living people
Anderson University (Indiana) alumni
Republican Party Indiana state senators
Year of birth missing (living people)